There is more than one school named Kearny High School:

Kearny High School (California)
Kearny High School (New Jersey)